The Adams-Arapahoe 28J School District, more commonly known as the Aurora Public Schools, is the public school system in Aurora, Colorado, United States.  There are 65 schools in the district: four early childhood education centers, 27 elementary schools, six P/K-8 schools, six middle schools, one grades 6-12 academy, six high schools, one gifted and talented K-8 school, 12 charter schools, one of only five vocational–technical colleges in the state, and one home school support program.

History
The first school district in Aurora was created at the request of William Smith by the Arapahoe County School Superintendent around 1885. It was known as Arapahoe County District #28 by 1907, and later Aurora School District. Aurora Public Schools was formed in 1962 from Aurora, Altura, Clyde Miller, First Creek, Sable, and Tollgate Districts.

Schools

Preschools
Early Beginnings
Jamaica Child Development Center 
Laredo Child Development Center
Meadowood  Child Development Center

Elementary schools

Middle schools
Aurora Hills Middle School
Aurora West College Preparatory Academy (Grades 6-12)
Columbia Middle School
East Middle School
Mrachek Middle School
North Middle School Health Sciences and Technology Campus
South Middle School

P-8 schools
Aurora Frontier P-8
Aurora Quest K-8
Boston P-8
Charles Burrell Visual & Performing Arts K-8
Clara Brown Entrepreneurial K-8
Clyde Miller P-8
Mosley P-8
Murphy Creek P-8
Vista Peak Exploratory P-8

Gifted and talented K-8 schools
Aurora Quest K-8

High schools

Aurora Central High School
Aurora West College Preparatory Academy
Charles Burrell Visual & Performing Arts
Gateway High School
Rangeview High School
Vista Peak Preparatory School
William C. Hinkley High School

Pilot schools
Fletcher Intermediate Science and Technology School
Fletcher Primary School
William Smith High School

Charter schools
Academy of Advanced Learning 
Aurora Academy
Aurora Expeditionary Learning Academy
Aurora Science & Tech, a DSST Public School
Empower Community School
Global Village Academy
Lotus School
Rocky Mountain Prep Academy
Vanguard Classical School
Vega Collegiate Academy

Alternative programs
APS Avenues
Crossroads Center
GED
IB Middle Years Programme
International Baccalaureate Programme
Options Schools 
Rebound Program

Career and technical education schools
Pickens Technical College

References

External links

 
School districts established in 1962
1962 establishments in Colorado